Dawar Khan Kundi is a Pakistani politician who was a member of the National Assembly of Pakistan from September 2013 to May 2018.

Political career

Kundi ran for the National Assembly from Constituency NA-25 (D.I.Khan-cum-Tank) as a candidate of the Pakistan Peoples Party (PPP) in the 2002 Pakistani general election, but was unsuccessful. He received 31,976 votes and lost the seat to Maulana Fazal-ur-Rehman.

He ran for the same seat as a PPP candidate in the 2008 Pakistani general election, but was unsuccessful once again, receiving 39,450 votes and losing the seat to Atta-ur-Rehman.

In 2013, Kundi ran for the same seat once more, this time as a candidate of Pakistan Tehreek-e-Insaf (PTI) but was unsuccessful. He received 47,543 votes and lost the seat to Maulana Fazal-ur-Rehman. Fazal-ur-Rehman later vacated the seat in order to retain the seat he had won in his home constituency, NA-24 (D.I.Khan).

Kundi finally won the constituency as a PTI candidate in a by-election held in September 2013. He received 64,218 votes and defeated a candidate of Jamiat Ulema-e Islam (F). 

He was the only MNA who voted against the constitutional amendment bill for FATA-KP merger in May 2018.

References

Living people
Pakistan Tehreek-e-Insaf MNAs
Pashtun people
Pakistani MNAs 2013–2018
Year of birth missing (living people)